Skiladiko or Skyladiko ,, is a derogatory term to describe a branch of laiko music and some of the current  nightclubs in Greece in which this music is performed. It also refers to the so-called "decadent" form of laiko, and is derived from the Greek for dog (σκύλος, skilos), meaning "doggish" or "doghouse". The term was also used to refer to cheap or often unlicensed Greek night clubs with a usually shady reputation of Greek music on the outskirts of a Greek city or town. The typical arrangement in current skiladika establishments includes an elevated stage ("palco") where singers and musicians perform Greek songs, with the use of heavily amplified bouzouki, electric guitars and other instruments.

Related Greek artists

Chryspa
Lefteris Pantazis
Giorgos Mazonakis
Nancy Alexiadi
Dionysis Makris
Kelly Kelekidou
Maro Litra
Vasilis Karras
Paola Foka
 Zafeiris Melas
 Anna Vissi
 Angela Dimitriou
 Antypas (singer)
 Themis Adamantidis

See also
Greek music
Rebetiko
Hasapiko
Pop music
Pop-folk
Bouzouki
Nightclubs in Greece
Kalamatianos
Greek dances

References

Greek music
Greek words and phrases
Pop music genres
Folk music genres